Ari Kurniawan (born April 11, 1978) is an Indonesian footballer who currently plays for Persiram Raja Ampat in the Indonesia Super League.

Club statistics

References

External links

1978 births
Association football goalkeepers
Living people
Indonesian footballers
Liga 1 (Indonesia) players
Persiram Raja Ampat players
Indonesian Premier Division players
Persekabpas Pasuruan players